George Griffith (1857–1906) was a science fiction writer and explorer.

George Griffith may also refer to:
George Griffith (MP), Member of Parliament (MP) for Staffordshire
George Griffith (cricketer) (1833–1879), English cricketer
George Griffith (bishop) (1601–1666), bishop of St. Asaph
George Marshall Griffith (1877–1946), early aviator in the Royal Flying Corps
George Griffith, former headmaster of The Perse School

See also
George Griffiths (disambiguation)
Georges Griffiths (1990–2017), Ivorian footballer
Griffith (surname)
George Griffin (disambiguation)